The 2017–18 United Counties League season (known as the 2017–18 ChromaSport & Trophies United Counties League for sponsorship reasons) was the 111th in the history of the United Counties League, a football competition in England.

The constitution for Step 5 and Step 6 divisions for 2017–18 was announced on 26 May 2017.

Premier Division

The Premier Division featured 19 clubs which competed in the division last season, along with three new clubs:
Daventry Town, promoted from Division One
St Andrews, transferred from the Midland League
Wellingborough Whitworth, promoted from Division One

League table

Division One

Division One featured 16 clubs which competed in the division last season, along with four new clubs:
Harrowby United, relegated from the Premier Division
Huntingdon Town, relegated from the Premier Division
Lutterworth Town, promoted from the Leicestershire Senior League
Pinchbeck United, promoted from the Peterborough & District League

League table

References

External links
United Counties League FA Full Time

9
United Counties League seasons